Joelle Schad (born 13 March 1973) is a former Dominican female tennis player.

Playing for Dominican Republic at the Fed Cup, Schad has accumulated a win–loss record of 38–21.

ITF Circuit finals

Singles: 10 (4–6)

Doubles: 15 (10-5)

References

External links 
 
 

1973 births
Living people
Sportspeople from Santo Domingo
Dominican Republic female tennis players
Tennis players at the 1991 Pan American Games
Pan American Games silver medalists for the Dominican Republic
Pan American Games medalists in tennis
Pan American Games bronze medalists for the Dominican Republic
Tennis players at the 1996 Summer Olympics
Olympic tennis players of the Dominican Republic
Central American and Caribbean Games medalists in tennis
Central American and Caribbean Games gold medalists for the Dominican Republic
Central American and Caribbean Games silver medalists for the Dominican Republic
Central American and Caribbean Games bronze medalists for the Dominican Republic
Tennis players at the 1987 Pan American Games
Medalists at the 1991 Pan American Games
20th-century Dominican Republic women
21st-century Dominican Republic women